Eupithecia hannemanni is a moth in the family Geometridae. It is found in western China and north-western Pakistan.

References

Moths described in 1973
hannemanni
Moths of Asia